Dragunov, feminine: Dragunova, a Russian surname.

Notable people with the surname include:
 Alexander Dragunov , Soviet philologist
 Ilja Dragunov, professional wrestler for NXT UK
 Yevgeny Dragunov  Soviet weapons designer who created the Dragunov Sniper Rifle
 Yevhen Drahunov, Ukrainian soccer player

Fictional characters 
 Sergei Dragunov, a Tekken character
 Dragunov, a fictional character from "Scrapped Princess", see List of Scrapped Princess characters

Russian-language surnames